The Antiochian Western Rite Vicariate (AWRV) is a Western rite vicariate of parishes and missions "that worship according to traditional Western Christian liturgical forms" within the Antiochian Orthodox Christian Archdiocese of North America of the Greek Orthodox Church of Antioch.

Origins
The vicariate began when three schismatic Society of St. Basil parishes, under Bishop Alexander Tyler Turner, were canonically received into the Greek Orthodox Church of Antioch by Metropolitan Anthony Bashir in 1961, after an eight-year probation period.

Current status
The vicariate consists of more than twenty churches and missions in all of the dioceses throughout the United States. Bishop John (Abdalah) of Worcester and New England oversees the vicariate assisted by its Vicar-General, Fr.Edward Hughes. Western Rite parishes are encouraged and expected to be active in the local diocese in which they are located, and episcopal functions are usually performed by the local diocesan bishop.

References

Further reading
  (also includes an excerpt from the report of Metropolitan Antony to the 1958 Archdiocesan Convention)

External links 

 

1961 establishments in New York (state)
Antiochian Orthodox Church in the United States
Christian organizations established in 1961
Eastern Orthodox organizations established in the 20th century
Western Rite Orthodoxy